Spezi is the brand name for a soft drink owned by Brauhaus Riegele in Augsburg, Germany. Spezi is a genericized trademark and the name is used as a generic term for a mixture of cola and orange soda in most German speaking countries.

When the brand was registered in 1956, Riegele at first sold beer under the trademark. Since the 1970s, Spezi has been produced and bottled by different local breweries under a franchising agreement. The first Original Spezi Cola Orange TV commercial aired in 1989.

Most large beverage manufacturers sell similar products, though mostly in Germany, Austria and Switzerland. Examples are Schwip Schwap by PepsiCo or Mezzo Mix by the Coca-Cola Company though most grocery store chains sell generic brand versions of the drink as well, usually called "Cola-Mix". 

Spezi contains water, glucose-fructose syrup, sugar, orange juice concentrate (2.3%), lemon juice from lemon juice concentrate (0.8%), carbon dioxide, caramel color, phosphoric acid and citric acid, natural flavoring, caffeine, citrus extract, locust bean gum (stabilizer). There are also different versions, including a sugar-free one.

References

External links
 

German cuisine
Citrus sodas
Non-alcoholic mixed drinks